Trånghalla Church is a church building in Trånghalla in Sweden. Belonging to the Bankeryd Parish of the Church of Sweden, the church was opened in 1969.

References

20th-century Church of Sweden church buildings
Churches in Jönköping Municipality
Churches completed in 1969
Churches in the Diocese of Växjö